Emerson is an unincorporated community in Lewis County, Kentucky, United States. Emerson had a post office, which closed on September 20, 1997.

References

Unincorporated communities in Lewis County, Kentucky
Unincorporated communities in Kentucky